The Public Companies Act 1767 (7 Geo III, c 48) was an Act of the Parliament of Great Britain that prohibited shareholders voting in public companies, unless they had held shares for six months. It was intended to stop vote splitting, so as to retain greater equality among members of companies.

Text

See also
UK company law
History of UK company law
Pender v Lushington

Notes

References

United Kingdom company law